Chippewa is an alternate term for the Ojibwe tribe of North America.

Chippewa may also refer to:

Languages
 another name for the Ojibwe language
 Chippewa language

Places

United States
 Chippewa, Wisconsin, a town
 Chippewa County, Michigan
 Chippewa County, Minnesota
 Chippewa County, Wisconsin
 Chippewa Falls, Wisconsin, a city
 Chippewa Township, Chippewa County, Michigan
 Chippewa Township, Isabella County, Michigan
 Chippewa Township, Mecosta County, Michigan
 Chippewa Township, Wayne County, Ohio
 Chippewa Township, Beaver County, Pennsylvania
 Chippewa River (Michigan)
 Chippewa River (Minnesota)
 Chippewa River (Wisconsin)
 Chippewa Valley, Wisconsin
 Chippewa National Forest, Michigan
 Chippewa Nature Center, a protected wildlife area in the Lower Peninsula of Michigan; also a non-profit educational organization
 Lake Chippewa, a prehistoric lake whose basin is now Lake Michigan

Canada
 Chippawa, Ontario, a community, sometimes spelled Chippewa in historical documents
 Chippewa River (Ontario)
 Chippewa Park, Ontario

Schools
 Chippewa High School, Doylestown, Ohio, United States
 Chippewa Valley High School, Clinton Townships, Michigan, United States
 Chippewa Secondary School, North Bay, Ontario, Canada
 Chippewa Middle School, in the Okemos Public Schools school district, Michigan, United States
 Chippewa Middle School, in the Mounds View Public Schools school district, Minnesota, United States

Other uses
 USS Chippewa, five vessels
 Central Michigan Chippewas, sports teams of Central Michigan University
 Chippewa-Hiawatha, originally named Chippewa, a passenger train that operated from 1937 to 1960
 Chippewa Street, the portion of Missouri Route 366 located in St. Louis, Missouri
 Chippewa Operating System, the operating system for the CDC 6600 supercomputer
 Chippewa Boots, a footwear and rainwear manufacturer originally known as Chippewa Shoe Manufacturing Company, founded in 1901
 Chippewa Correctional Facility, Michigan
 Colias chippewa, a butterfly

Tribes and First Nations 
 Bad River Band of the Lake Superior Tribe of Chippewa Indians of the Bad River Reservation, Wisconsin
 Chippewa Cree Indians of the Rocky Boy's Reservation, Montana
 Chippewas of Georgina Island First Nation, Ontario
 Chippewas of Kettle and Stony Point First Nation, Ontario
 Chippewas of Nawash Unceded First Nation, Ontario
 Chippewas of Rama First Nation, Ontario
 Chippewas of Sarnia First Nation, Ontario, now Aamjiwnaang First Nation
 Chippewas of Saugeen, southwestern Ontario, now Saugeen First Nation
 Chippewas of the Thames First Nation, Ontario
 Grand Traverse Band of Ottawa and Chippewa Indians, Michigan
 Lac Courte Oreilles Band of Lake Superior Chippewa Indians of Wisconsin
 Lac du Flambeau Band of Lake Superior Chippewa Indians of the Lac du Flambeau Reservation of Wisconsin
 Lac Vieux Desert Band of Lake Superior Chippewa Indians, Michigan
 Little Shell Tribe of Chippewa Indians of Montana
 Minnesota Chippewa Tribe, Minnesota
 Red Cliff Band of Lake Superior Chippewa Indians of Wisconsin
 Red Lake Band of Chippewa Indians, Minnesota
 Saginaw Chippewa Indian Tribe of Michigan
 Sault Ste. Marie Tribe of Chippewa Indians of Michigan
 Sokaogon Chippewa Community, Wisconsin
 St. Croix Chippewa Indians of Wisconsin
 Turtle Mountain Band of Chippewa Indians of North Dakota

See also
Chippawa (disambiguation)
Chipewyan, a First Nations people in the Arctic region of Canada, unrelated to the Ojibwe